This is a list of films that feature non-avian dinosaurs (that is, not featuring birds) and other prehistoric (mainly Mesozoic) archosaurs, pterosaurs and prehistoric (mainly Mesozoic) marine reptiles (such as mosasaurs and plesiosaurs).

Live-Action films

Animated films

See also
 Cultural depictions of dinosaurs
 List of films featuring giant monsters

Notes

References

Further reading

Dinosaurs, List of films featuring
 
Dinosaur-related lists